Hugo Charlemont (18 March 1850 – 18 April 1939) was an Austrian painter. Born in Jemnice, Moriva he was the son of Matthais Adolf Charlemont. He studied art at the Academy of Fine Arts. He died in Vienna.

Life
Charlemont was born in Jemnice, Moravia. He was the son of the miniature painter Matthias Adolf Charlemont and the brother of the painters Eduard Charlemont (1848–1906) and Theodor Charlemont (1859–1938). Hugo's daughter Lilly Charlemont also was an artist.

From 1873 he studied art at the Academy of Fine Arts, Vienna under Eduard von Lichtenfels. Charlemont was a painter of landscapes, still lifes, genre subjects, animals, and portraits. He died in Vienna.

Works

 Interieur with a forge (Vienna, Austrian gallery, Inv. No. 2784), 1883, oil on wood, 48.5 x 70 cm
 Highway with Birkenallee (Vienna, Austrian gallery, Inv. No. 253), 1894, oil on wood, 68 x 100 cm
 Park with elegant Viennese villa (Vienna museum), 1902, oil on canvas, 145 x 100 cm
 Young woman with azalea plant (Vienna museum), 1928, oil on canvas, 68 x 83 cm
 Illustration to "Kronprinzenwerk" (Austrian-Hungarian monarchy in word and pictures, 1885–1902).
 Harp, (Sweden, private collection) ND, oil on wood
 Forest Pond, (Colorado, private collection) 1922, oil on canvas, 36 x 26 cm

Further reading
 Robert Janás: Bratři Charlemontové – makartovské tendence v moravské malbě. Sborník Forum Brunense 2017, pp. 19–37.

References

External links

ArtNet: More works by Charlemont

19th-century Austrian painters
19th-century Austrian male artists
Austrian male painters
20th-century Austrian painters
1850 births
1939 deaths
People from Jemnice
Moravian-German people
Austrian people of Moravian-German descent
Burials at Döbling Cemetery
20th-century Austrian male artists